Hugh Robertson (29 November 1939 – 12 March 2010) was a Scottish association football player and manager. He played as a winger for the Dundee team that won the Scottish league championship in 1962, and the Dunfermline side that won the 1968 Scottish Cup. He played 40 games for Arbroath, including their promotion from Division 2 in 1971-2.  He later managed Danish club Herfølge.

Robertson represented the Scotland national football team once, in a vital 1962 FIFA World Cup qualifying match against Czechoslovakia. Injuries to Davie Wilson and Alex Scott meant that Robertson and Ralph Brand were brought in for the match, which Scotland had to win to qualify. Despite two goals by Ian St. John, Scotland lost 4–2 after extra time.

Robertson died at his home on 12 March 2010.

References

External links 

1939 births
2010 deaths
Arbroath F.C. players
Association football wingers
Dundee F.C. players
Dunfermline Athletic F.C. players
Herfølge Boldklub managers
Expatriate football managers in Denmark
Footballers from East Ayrshire
Place of death missing
Scottish Football League players
Scottish football managers
Scottish expatriate football managers
Scottish footballers
Scotland international footballers
Scotland under-23 international footballers